The Lega Nazionale Dilettanti (National Amateur League) is the league which rules amateur football of Italian Football Federation (FIGC) in Italy.

Founded in 1959 in Rome, it has many leagues inside: a national league, the Inter-regional Committee, which organizes the Serie D championship from 1981, 19 regional leagues organized by 20 Regional Committees (Piedmont and Aosta Valley shared the same committee; South Tyrol and Trentino has its own committee but same regional league), the Women Football Division, and the Futsal Division.

Men league
Interregional
 Serie D
Regional
 Eccellenza
 Promozione
 Prima Categoria
 Seconda Categoria
 Terza Categoria

Regional Committees
 Abruzzo
 Apulia
 Basilicata
 Calabria
 Campania
 Emilia–Romagna
 Friuli – Venezia Giulia
 Lazio
 Liguria 
 Lombardy
 Marche
 Molise
 Piedmont and Aosta Valley
 Sardinia
 Sicily
 Tuscany
 Trentino and South Tyrol
 Umbria
 Veneto

External links
Official site 

Football governing bodies in Italy
1959 establishments in Italy